Yang Buzhi (1098–1167) was born in Qingjiang (modern Huai'an), Jiangxi Province, in China.

He is regarded as a master of ink paintings of plum blossoms in the Song Dynasty, and developed techniques which influenced later painters.  He "resolved the depiction of flowering plum into a linear system built from brushstrokes and structures adapted from calligraphy".

Four Stages of Blossoming Plum, circa 1165, is the only surviving work that can be attributed to him with certainty.

References

1098 births
1167 deaths
Song dynasty painters
People from Yichun, Jiangxi
Painters from Jiangxi